Mong or Meng is a Chinese surname. It is a xing (姓) (ancestral surname). The surname is typically romanised as Meng in Mandarin and Mong or Mung in Cantonese. Other romanisations include Mông, Muhng, Mang, and Bong.

Most people with the surname Mong are from the Guangdong or Fujian Province areas. The surname is currently most popular in the Guangxi Autonomous Region.

The character  is also used as an abbreviation for Mongolia.

People surnamed Mong
Notable people with the surname Mong or Meng include:
 William Mong, Hong Kong businessman
 Meng Dalai, Ming-dynasty political figure
 Meng Ao, Warring States-era military general
 Meng Wu, son of Meng Ao
 Meng Tian, son of Meng Wu
 Meng Yi, son of Meng Wu
 Meng Caicheng, participant in the Xinhai Revolution
 Meng Daqiao, Chinese nuclear scientist
 Meng Dengjin, Chinese historian and scholar of philosophy
 Meng Dingjun, Chinese politician and intelligence officer
 Meng De'en, senior official in the Taiping Heavenly Kingdom
 Meng Gan, 11th-century Song-dynasty political rebel
 Meng Hui, Ming-dynasty political figure
 Meng Jinxi, Chinese lieutenant general in the People's Liberation Army
 Mong Kwan Yi, Hong Kong badminton player
 Yoyo Mung Ka-wai, Hong Kong actress
 Meng Lanfeng, Chinese politician
 Meng Man, Manchu scholar
 Meng Meilu, Chinese politician
 Meng Peiyuan, Chinese historian and scholar of philosophy
 Meng Qixun, Chinese political figure
 Meng Qiliang, member of the Chinese Communist Party
 Meng Shiyong, official in the Taiping Heavenly Kingdom
 Meng Sufen, Chinese politician
 Meng Wentong, Chinese historian specialising in pre-Qin dynasty history
 Meng Shaoling, Chinese politician
 Meng Yongshan, Chinese procurator
 Joseph Meng Ziwen, Chinese Catholic bishop
 Meng Zhengfa, Ming-dynasty political figure
 Meng Hu, Mongolian internet blogger who goes by the name "酒徒"
 Mung Wai Leong, Hong Kong reporter and radio host
 Shi Renqing, Chinese monk whose secular name was Meng Wending
 Mong Hon-ming, Hong Kong media worker and former editor-in-chief of East Week
 Meng Zhao, Ming-dynasty political figure

See also
 Mengzi City (southeast Yunnan Province)
 Mengyin County (southwest-central Shandong)

Chinese-language surnames
Individual Chinese surnames